The 1936 United States presidential election in Kansas took place on November 3, 1936 as part of 1936 United States presidential election held in all forty-eight contemporary states. Kansas voters chose nine electors, or representatives to the Electoral College, who voted for President and Vice President.

Background
Kansas had been a powerfully Republican state during the 1920s (as it had been during its first quarter-century of statehood), although it did not possess the isolationist sentiment found in Appalachia or the Upper Midwest. In 1928 large-scale anti-Catholic voting swept a state substantially part of the Ozark “Bible Belt”, so that whereas Kansas had been less anti-Democratic than more northerly Plains states in 1920 and 1924, it became Herbert Hoover’s best state in the entire nation in 1928.

A major drought affected the Great Plains in the 1930s, producing dramatic swings against incumbent President Hoover in 1932, which were more overwhelming in Kansas than in states further north, though less so than in the traditionally Democratic Southern Plains that had been vehemently against Al Smith’s Catholic faith in 1928. During Franklin Delano Roosevelt's first term as President, Kansas twice elected Republican Governor Alfred Mossman Landon, who proved himself a skilled administrator, who was critical of the excesses of the Agricultural Adjustment Act and was the only GOP governor re-elected in 1934. Landon was to have relatively little trouble gaining the Republican nomination against the popular Roosevelt in 1936.

Vote
Although some observers thought that Landon could bring back the West and Plains which had completely deserted Herbert Hoover in 1932, Landon could not achieve this to any significant degree. Although he carried more than thirty counties that had supported Roosevelt in 1932, Landon did not make the hoped-for gains there, and any gains he did make were offset by substantial losses in Kansas’ larger cities, where Landon’s later anti-New Deal rhetoric was unpopular. Landon consequently improved on Hoover’s 1932 showing by only 1.71 percentage points even in a state that had known him as governor, although Kansas was Landon’s fourth-best state by vote percentage behind Vermont, Maine and New Hampshire (the first two being the only states in the Union which Landon carried in the Electoral College). This would be the penultimate time Kansas would support a Democratic presidential candidate—the only subsequent Democrat to win the state being Lyndon B. Johnson in another landslide win in 1964.

, this is the last occasion the following counties have voted for a Democratic presidential candidate: Chase, Cheyenne, Decatur, Graham, Greenwood, Harper, Kiowa, Lincoln, Marion, Meade, Mitchell, Morris, Rawlins, Rooks, Scott and Seward.

Results

Results by county

See also
 United States presidential elections in Kansas

Notes

References

Kansas
1936
1936 Kansas elections